111 West 57th Street, also known as Steinway Tower, is a supertall residential skyscraper in the Midtown Manhattan neighborhood of New York City. Developed by JDS Development Group and Property Markets Group, it is situated along Billionaires' Row on the north side of 57th Street near Sixth Avenue. The main portion of the building is an 84-story,  tower designed by SHoP Architects and completed in 2021. Preserved at the base is the 16-story Steinway Building (also Steinway Hall), a former Steinway & Sons store designed by Warren and Wetmore and completed in 1925, which originally carried the address 111 West 57th Street.

111 West 57th Street contains 60 luxury condominiums: 14 in Steinway Hall and 46 in the tower. The residential tower has a glass facade with piers made of terracotta; its pinnacle contains setbacks on the southern side. The tower is the fourth-tallest building in the United States as of November 2022, as well as the thinnest skyscraper in the world with a width-to-height ratio of about 1:24. Steinway Hall, a New York City designated landmark, contains a facade made mostly of brick, limestone, and terracotta. 111 West 57th Street contains numerous resident amenities, housed mostly in the building's base, as well as a large rotunda within Steinway Hall that is also a designated city landmark.

The Steinway & Sons store at 111 West 57th Street was planned in 1916 but was not completed for nine years due to lawsuits and other delays. Steinway Hall served as a store, recital hall, and office building for almost nine decades, though it was unsuccessful as a speculative development. Plans for a residential skyscraper on the site date to 2005, and JDS acquired the lots for the skyscraper between 2012 and 2013. Despite the tower's size, it was technically constructed as an addition to Steinway Hall. Construction on the tower began in 2014, and Steinway Hall was restored as part of the residential project. The development faced several challenges, including financing difficulties, lawsuits, and controversies over employment. The tower's concrete form topped out during April 2019, and work was completed in 2021.

Site 

111 West 57th Street is in the Midtown Manhattan neighborhood of New York City, just south of Central Park, between Sixth Avenue to the east and Seventh Avenue to the west. The building occupies the land lots at 105–113 West 57th Street and contains frontage along 57th Street to the south and 58th Street to the north.

111 West 57th Street occupies the same city block as the Calvary Baptist Church, One57, and Alwyn Court to the west, and abuts The Quin immediately to the east. 111 West 57th Street is also near Carnegie Hall, Carnegie Hall Tower, and Metropolitan Tower one block west; Parker New York, 130 West 57th Street, and 140 West 57th Street across 57th Street to the south; and Hampshire House and Trump Parc across 58th Street to the north. The building stands across from the 57th Street station of the New York City Subway's . 111 West 57th Street is one of several major developments around 57th Street and Central Park that are collectively dubbed Billionaires' Row by the media. Other buildings along Billionaires' Row include 432 Park Avenue four blocks southeast, 220 Central Park South one block northwest, Central Park Tower one block west, and the nearby One57.

111 West 57th Street's base contains Steinway Hall, a former store and recital hall for Steinway & Sons. Steinway Hall was completed in 1925 by Warren & Wetmore and is a New York City designated landmark. Steinway Hall was part of an artistic hub developed around the two blocks of West 57th Street from Sixth Avenue west to Broadway during the late 19th and early 20th centuries, following the opening of Carnegie Hall in 1891. The area contains several buildings constructed as residences for artists and musicians, such as 130 and 140 West 57th Street, the Rodin Studios, and the Osborne Apartments. In addition, the area contained the headquarters of organizations such as the American Fine Arts Society, the Lotos Club, and the American Society of Civil Engineers.

Architecture
111 West 57th Street, also known as Steinway Tower, was developed by Michael Stern's JDS Development Group and Kevin P. Maloney's Property Markets Group (PMG). WSP USA was the structural engineer for the project, while Jaros, Baum & Bolles was the engineer in charge of mechanical, electrical, and plumbing.

The building has two components. Warren and Wetmore's original Steinway Hall, at the base of the development, is topped by a  tower designed by SHoP Architects. The building contains 84 stories above ground level or 85 including the roof slab. The top story is numbered as floor 91, while floor numbers 5–7, 13, and 21–25 are skipped. There is also a sub-cellar and cellar, used primarily for utilities and storage.

Form 
The concert hall has a setback above the 12th story on 57th Street, and setbacks above the 9th and 12th stories on 58th Street. The 16th story along 57th Street (marketed as floor 19) is also set back from all sides. The roof of Steinway Hall contains a campanile with a pyramidal copper roof and lantern, similar to the Mausoleum at Halicarnassus. Christopher Gray of The New York Times described the campanile as having a "sculptural, even funerary, caste".

The residential tower atop Steinway Hall is one of the tallest buildings in the United States, as well as the thinnest skyscraper in the world with a width-to-height ratio of about 1:24. Due to its slenderness, the top stories sway several feet during high winds. The building has been characterized as part of a new breed of New York City "pencil towers". The tower's northern elevation rises directly up to the pinnacle, and the southern elevation contains several setbacks as the tower rises, thinning the tower's footprint on higher floors. The pinnacle's lighting pattern was commissioned by L'Observatoire International. Because of the shape of the tower's pinnacle, 111 West 57th Street is nicknamed "Stairway to Heaven".

Facade

Steinway Hall

On the first three stories of Steinway Hall's southern elevation, facing 57th Street, the facade is made of Indiana Limestone above a pink-granite water table. Two rectangular portals flank a large central arch there. The outer portals contain wooden pocket doors, which are surrounded by moldings and topped with entablatures. The central opening is a display window that contains an entablature supported by Ionic columns on either side, as well as a lunette above the entablature. The lunette has a cement sculptural group by Leo Lentelli, which contains a bas-relief of Apollo. Above the third story is a frieze with portraits of classical composers and pianists, as well as a central plaque with the name "Steinway".

The northern elevation on 58th Street is clad with brick, limestone, and terracotta. The lowest two floors contain rusticated limestone blocks; the first floor has loading docks on either end. One of the 58th Street loading docks led to a freight elevator for Steinway Hall's tenants, while the other led to a freight elevator used specifically by Steinway & Sons.

Steinway Hall's upper stories are clad with brick. On 57th Street, there are three pairs of windows on each of the 4th through 12th stories. On 58th Street, there are five windows on each of the 3rd through 12th stories; there is a balustrade at the third story and a cornice atop the 9th story. Above the 12th story, on both 57th and 58th Streets, is a parapet capped by urns. The western elevation is clad with plain brick and contains some window openings. The 13th through 15th stories of Steinway Hall have chamfered corners and Ionic colonnades, with a parapet above the 15th story. The 16th story has brick piers at each corner, shallow arches on each side, band courses at the bottom, and a cornice at the top.

Tower

The tower's facade was designed by BuroHappold. The portion of the tower's base at ground level, which is not occupied by Steinway Hall, contains doors with aluminum or bronze frames. This section serves as the retail entrance and was included only because zoning rules mandated it. The northern and southern elevations consist of large glass curtain walls. There are bronze mullions between the windows, which project slightly from the glass curtain wall. The top section of the northern elevation, above the highest habitable story, contains reflective glass panels in front of the pinnacle's reinforced concrete walls. There are glass parapets above each setback, and the roof terraces also contain guard rails made of aluminum, bronze, or steel.

The eastern and western elevations contain narrow windows between vertical piers of glazed terracotta. Six tones of white were used for the terracotta. The terracotta piers are made of extruded and glazed blocks arranged in a wave-like pattern. The piers are meant to be reminiscent of older terracotta designs in New York City, and the beige color complements the limestone facade of Steinway Hall. Each of the terracotta piers rises to the height of one of the setbacks on the pinnacle. There are also bronze mullions, which contain curving patterns resembling bird feathers, between the piers. The piers and mullions serve partially to stabilize the tower by creating wind turbulence.

Structural features 
The existing Steinway Hall contains a structural steel frame atop a foundation with reinforced concrete and steel grillages. The foundations of the tower contain about 200 rock anchors that descend at most  into the underlying bedrock. These deep foundations are necessitated by the tower's extreme slenderness. The building has two cellar levels. Steinway Hall originally had a cellar vault extending under the roadway at 57th Street, which was partially infilled and modified as part of the tower's construction.

The superstructure of 111 West 57th Street's tower is made mostly of concrete. The core structural system is formed by two large shear walls installed behind the eastern and western facades, maximizing usable floor area. The floors are also supported by additional beams at three-story intervals, as well as four outrigger walls on the mechanical floors and  beams on the southern side of each floor. Interior walls above the floor slabs also connect the shear walls. The top of the tower includes an  tuned mass damper to provide stability against high winds or earthquakes. The damper consists of tuned steel plates.

Interior 
111 West 57th Street's interior spaces were designed by Studio Sofield, though the interior of the original Steinway Hall was planned by Walter L. Hopkins. There are 60 apartments in total: 46 in the tower and 14 in Steinway Hall.

The building has  of amenity space across several floors. Spanning the cellar and floors 1, 3, and 4 is a "non-residential unit", which contains  of commercial space. Several stories in the tower and base contain mechanical equipment. Additionally, floors 51, 71, and 86 contain windbreaks and are not occupied. 111 West 57th Street contains fourteen elevators: five in Steinway Hall and nine in the tower. Seven of the tower elevators are within individual suites, while the remaining seven elevators are shared by all residents. Steinway Hall had initially contained six elevators, one of which was upgraded as part of the residential project.

Ground floor 

The original western and eastern entrance vestibules on 57th Street have pink-granite floors and coffered domed ceilings. The eastern vestibule leads to a rectangular foyer with a vaulted ceiling, which in turn connects to the main rotunda and the original floor 2. The western vestibule leads north to a marble corridor that connects to Steinway Hall's original elevator lobby. The original elevator lobby had Botticino marble walls and black-and-white terrazzo flooring. A stone porte-cochère for residents is on 58th Street. There is a passenger and freight elevator connecting the cellar and ground-level loading dock.

The sides of the rotunda consist of four white marble arches, green marble pilasters with coffered pendentives, and a continuous marble cornice just below the dome. A large chandelier hangs from the dome. Four paintings by Paul Arndt, depicting "the influence of music on human relations", are hung on the wall. The paintings are surrounded by grotesques and images painted by Cooper and Gentiluomo. The rotunda's southern wall contains the arched display window facing 57th Street. Behind the northern wall are three green-marble archways on floor 1 and a balcony on floor 2. The central arch on the north wall led to piano showrooms in the rear of floor 1, while the right arch led to the basement. The rotunda sat up to 300 guests and a small symphony orchestra. When used by Steinway & Sons, the rotunda contained ornate furniture and paintings evocative of an upper-class home.

Steinway Hall's showrooms were clustered around a corridor that led from the rotunda. The corridor from the rotunda to these showrooms had dull red and old rose furniture, as well as green wall surfaces. The showrooms were covered with wood panels for better acoustics. The first showroom past the rotunda and foyers was the Pine Room, which had pine-paneled walls, draped windows, illumination from chandeliers and ceiling bulbs, and an ivory-white plaster ceiling in low relief. Dimmers were provided so the light could be intensified for instrument examination. Two other showrooms had cream-colored, paneled walls and low-relief ceilings; one of these rooms had decorative paintings and medallions on the ceiling. Another showroom, known as the skylight room, had black-and-white wallpaper decorations depicting scenes in the French Empire style, as well as a skylight over more than half the room. The rear of the ground floor contained the Walnut Room, with walnut-paneled walls, windows facing 58th Street, and a beamed ceiling with pastel-color designs. Antique pieces throughout all the display rooms were arranged to complement the piano displays.

Following the construction of the residential tower, the rotunda was converted to a retail space with entrances from the residential lobby and the street. The residential lobby contains gold and silver-leaf murals with ebony and elephant motifs, a reference to the materials used in pianos. Also in the lobby is a mailroom, concierge area, shared toilet, and lounge. The elevator lobby contains custom bronze doors by Nancy Lorenz.

Amenities and Steinway Hall units 
Floor 2 contained four display rooms, which generally were larger than the ground-floor showrooms. They generally had cream-colored walls and ceilings and were connected by a corridor with pea-green walls. Floor 3 was initially Steinway Hall's executive offices while floors 4 and 8 (originally the fourth and fifth floors, respectively) were composed of soundproof music studios. The original musical salon on floor 3 could fit 250 people and was designed with blue-gray plaster walls, a cream-colored low-relief ceiling, a gold-leaf cornice, an oak parquet floor, and a lighting system with a dimmer. Following the residential conversion, floor 8 has contained a residents' rehearsal room and offices; the room's design references the building's historical use. The non-residential areas between the cellar and floor 4 are served by a single elevator.

Floors 10 and 10M constitute the building's common amenity area. There is an  indoor pool with a limestone deck and cabanas, as well as sauna, steam, and treatment rooms adjacent to the pool. Floors 10 and 10M also contain a private dining room, fitness center, and study. The amenity areas on floors 10 and 10M are connected by their own elevator.

The remaining stories of Steinway Hall were originally rented as office space. The floors up to the 15th story (now floor 18) typically measured , with more space facing 58th Street than 57th Street. The 16th story (now floor 19) was much smaller and was intended as a studio apartment. They consist of ten 3-bedroom units, three 1-bedroom units, and one studio apartment. Floor 11 has one 3-bedroom unit as well as the studio and 1-bedroom units, while floors 12, 14, 16, and 17 each have two 3-bedroom units. The largest unit, a three-bedroom duplex penthouse on floors 19 and 20, contains a stone entrance foyer, private terraces, an office, a den, a kitchen, and a living room with  ceilings. These units are all connected to ground level and floor 10 by a pair of elevators.

Tower units
The apartments start above the 17th story, numbered as floor 20, because the views of Central Park from the lower floors are obstructed by neighboring buildings. The units are mostly three-bedroom apartments each occupying one full floor, except for seven duplex units on floors 60–61 and 72–83, which each have between two and four bedrooms. Many of the stories are open in plan and have  ceilings. , prices ranged from $16 million for a studio apartment to over $66 million for the triplex penthouse.

P. E. Guerin Hardware designed bronze doorknobs on the living-room doors, which are shaped like the tower itself. The kitchens typically have quartzite counters as well as built-in appliances such as dishwashers, ovens, refrigerators, and freezers. The units also contain dark wood and onyx floors, an acknowledgment of the design of Steinway Hall. A typical unit, such as the residence on floor 43, has a living room facing north toward Central Park and master and guest bedrooms facing south, as well as walk-in closets and custom bathroom appliances. Some tower units have been customized, such as a unit on floor 34, designed by Kelly Behun with a musically-influenced theme. A pair of elevators connect each of the tower stories to the ground level and floor 10. One is a double-deck elevator with a service cab on the lower deck, which also descends to the cellar, while the other is a single-deck elevator. In addition, each of the duplex units have private elevators connecting both floors in the unit.

History

Steinway Hall
Since 1864, Steinway & Sons had operated a piano showroom and performance auditorium at 14th Street in Lower Manhattan, where the piano industry was concentrated. When Carnegie Hall opened in 1891, the piano industry moved uptown to 57th Street, prompting Steinway & Sons to look for new sites in that area.

Construction and opening 
By July 1916, the company had identified a site at 109–113 West 57th Street, between Sixth and Seventh Avenues, with a parcel extending back to 58th Street. William K. Benedict and Marvin & Davis designed a 10-story building for the site. Work was delayed because the 1916 Zoning Resolution prohibited non-residential buildings on that section of 58th Street; additionally, neighborhood residents had filed lawsuits against Steinway & Sons, which were settled by July 1920. Steinway & Sons acquired eight lots on 57th and 58th Streets from 1920 to 1924, and Warren and Wetmore designed a 16-story building, for which plans were filed in July 1923. The new Steinway Hall was built from June 1924 to April 1925. Many of the studios had already been rented by late 1924.

The hall at 111 West 57th Street officially opened on October 27, 1925, with a performance by Willem Mengelberg and 35 musicians from the New York Philharmonic, broadcast over radio. The building had cost $3 million, representing about a quarter of Steinway & Sons' total assets at the time. Steinway & Sons used the five lowest floors and rented out the upper floors. The basement housed storage, shipping, and a grand-piano testing area; the first story, a reception room and salesroom; the second story, salesrooms; the third floor, executive offices; and the fourth and fifth stories, music studios. Steinway & Sons used only the rear of the fourth story, where it had a large workroom. The "piano bank" in the basement had over 300 pianos, valued at over $15 million.

Usage 
According to a New Yorker article in 2001, "almost every twentieth-century virtuoso has passed through" the first-floor reception room while headed to the Concert and Artists Department in the basement. Among the notable performances at the 57th Street building was the 1928 duo piano recital by Vladimir Horowitz and Sergei Rachmaninoff. The 57th Street building was also intended as a speculative development for Steinway & Sons; it was not particularly successful in that respect, with a rate of return of only 2 percent. Even so, by 1940, all studios in the Steinway Building had been leased. Throughout the years, the building's tenants also included publications such as Musical America, Architectural Forum, and The Economist, as well as CBS broadcasting studios.

Steinway Hall received an $850,000 first mortgage from Hubbard, Westervelt & Mottelay Inc. in 1939. The onset of World War II forced the closure of the building's recital hall. In March 1957, the Manhattan Life Insurance Company leased some space on the third floor for its tabulating and accounting departments. Steinway Hall and its land were sold to Manhattan Life the following year, with the insurance company planning to occupy the building as its home office. At that time, Musical Forum, Columbia Artists Management, and the Philharmonic Symphony Society of New York were among Steinway Hall's tenants. 111 West 57th Street was thus renamed the Manhattan Life Insurance Company Building. Steinway & Sons continued to lease space there, including the ground-floor showroom. Steinway Hall was acquired by 111 West 57th Street Associates in 1980. Bernard H. Mendik had acquired the leasehold for $8.65 million in that transaction.

In 1990, the Apollo sculpture above the main entrance was restored, and the plaque above the entrance was replaced, after The Economist became a tenant at 111 West 57th Street. In 1997, Jeffrey Biegel performed the first classical music recital transmitted live over the internet, with audio and video, at Steinway Hall. Steinway bought back the building in May 1999 for approximately $62 million; the firm leased the land for 99 years from the building's former owner, who chose to retain ownership of the land. The New York City Landmarks Preservation Commission (LPC) designated Steinway Hall as a New York City landmark in November 2001. Manhattan Life moved out of the building that year, and an XM Satellite Radio studio opened there.

Residential tower planning

Early plans 
In May 2005, Investcorp and Ceebraid-Signal purchased the one-story Ritz Fur Shop building at 107 West 57th Street, adjacent to Steinway Hall, for $23 million, along with $8.75 million for neighboring air rights. According to The Real Deal, the sale was finalized in 2006 for $52 million. The companies planned a 35-story tower on the site with 37 residential units, three lower floors of office space, and ground floor and basement retail space.

In October 2006, Barry Sternlicht's Starwood Capital Group purchased the site at 105–107 West 57th Street for $52 million with a $30 million loan from Eurohypo. Demolition of the site was underway the same year. Before the financial crisis of 2007–2008, Starwood Capital reportedly planned to construct a new hotel tower for sister company Starwood as part of a new "Hotel Crillon" luxury brand based on Paris's Hôtel de Crillon. In early 2012, Starwood sold a majority interest in the assemblage to JDS Development Group for $40 million and stayed on as a joint venture partner. That March, the first plans for the site at 105–107 West 57th Street were filed with the New York City Department of Buildings for a 51-story tower rising  and containing 27 condominiums. Renderings of the planned development were revealed that September, showing a sloping tower by CetraRuddy, covered with balconies facing Central Park. At the time, construction was expected to take place from early 2013 to late 2014.

JDS and PMG control 
At the end of 2012, Steinway & Sons announced that it would sell Steinway Hall, adjacent to the planned development at 107 West 57th Street, for $46 million. At the time, Steinway & Sons was losing $5 million a year from continuing to own Steinway Hall. In March 2013, a joint venture of JDS Development, PMG, and Arthur P. Becker officially purchased Steinway Hall. Becker allegedly purchased his stake with the help of a $21 million loan from Russian oligarchs Serguei Adoniev and Albert Avdolyan, concealed via numerous offshore LLCs in the British Virgin Islands and Hong Kong orchestrated by British financier Andy Ruhan. JDS paid $131.5 million to Wexford Capital for the land underneath the building, an adjacent structure, and air rights in July 2013. After the purchase, Starwood Capital Group exited their investment, leaving JDS and PMG as the developers. However, because of Steinway Hall's existing city landmark status, the LPC could approve or deny any plans involving modification of Steinway Hall, and any additions would need to be constructed around the existing structure.

Steinway & Sons was allowed to remain in the building for 18 months after the sale. The developers either bought out the other eleven tenants' leases or waited for the leases to expire. Not long after the developers bought Steinway Hall, they secured a $230 million acquisition loan from Annaly Capital Management on the development site. Stern and Maloney did not yet have the cash to fund the tower's construction. Although Ruhan had promised to be a primary investor, he subsequently lowered his investment and took a 26.3 percent stake with his partner Arthur P. Becker. Accordingly, AmBase Corporation purchased a 59 percent stake in the development for $56 million in June 2013. Stern and Maloney retained the remaining 14.7 percent stake.

With the acquisition of Steinway Hall, the developers decided to create new plans. The developers considered several architects, including CetraRuddy, Gehry, and HOK, before ultimately hiring SHoP Architects. In an interview, Stern said that he had selected SHoP because the firm was "not afraid to push boundaries", as in its design of the Barclays Center arena. In August 2013, the developers filed permits for a 74-story,  tower that would hold 100 condominiums above six floors of retail. SHoP's plans incorporated the existing structure into the base of the new tower. Further complicating the planning process, the LPC had considered landmark status for Steinway Hall's rotunda in mid-2013; such a designation would require the developers to preserve the space. JDS and PMG expressed support for the landmark status, and the LPC designated the rotunda as a landmark that September. The same month, The Wall Street Journal published updated renderings for the tower. JDS and Property Markets Group presented their plans to the LPC in October 2013, and the commission approved the plans, paving the way for full construction permits.

Tower construction

The developers broke ground on the project in early 2014. In January 2015, the New York City Department of Buildings approved final permits for the project. At the time, the tower was to contain 55 luxury condominiums and would be finished in 2017. Due to technicalities in New York City zoning law, the new tower was classified as an alteration of the existing Steinway Hall, which also had the address 111 West 57th Street. With the tower's construction, that building's floor area would increase 2,850 percent.

Financial issues 
Meanwhile, construction costs had risen by over $50 million because of complications in working around Steinway Hall. To cover the extra costs, the developers had issued six capital calls totaling $63.6 million. AmBase participated in only the first four calls, and each time, provided a small portion of the funding that JDS and PMG requested. AmBase's stake was subsequently reduced from 60.3 percent to 43.5 percent, and by May 2015, AmBase was looking to reduce its involvement in 111 West 57th Street. The next month, the developers received a four-year, $725 million construction loan, split between a $400 million senior loan from American International Group and a $325 million mezzanine loan from Apollo Global Management. The Qatar Investment Authority provided $161.5 million of the mezzanine loan through investment vehicles managed by Apollo.

In March 2016, Maloney told Bloomberg News that sales at the building would not commence until the following year. This was attributed to a general slowdown in the luxury residential market. By June 2016, the project had risen above street level. The project still encountered financial difficulty and faced a lawsuit from AmBase. In January 2017, the developers had defaulted on the $325 million mezzanine loan from Apollo. However, they negotiated a forbearance agreement on $300 million of the debt and the remaining $25 million was sold to Spruce Capital Management. The developers were in the process of negotiating another $100 million mezzanine loan from Baupost Group to repay Spruce but the loan was vetoed by AmBase. Meanwhile, the landmark facade of Steinway Hall was restored in early 2017. Construction had stalled by July 2017, after the tower had been built to 20 stories. At the time, Spruce claimed that it had not received payment on the $25 million mezzanine loan and filed paperwork to begin the process of foreclosure, leading AmBase to file another lawsuit against Maloney, Stern, and Spruce. The next month, the New York Supreme Court ruled that Spruce Capital could proceed with foreclosure. This allowed the lender to transfer the development entirely to Maloney and Stern, wiping out AmBase's investment completely.

Despite the building's monetary and legal issues, a number of apartments in the tower had already gone to contract. Two months later, Madison Realty Capital provided a $90 million preferred equity investment in the tower, allowing construction to continue. The developers filed paperwork with the Attorney General of New York to raise prices at the project in August 2018. Sales at the project officially relaunched the next month with prices ranging from $18 million to over $57 million. By then, the building was more commonly known by its address than as "Steinway Tower".

Completion
The building's concrete form topped out during April 2019, and the steel reached the top of the parapet that October. Despite an unfavorable luxury real estate market, the building's  penthouse entered contract in mid-2019 for "close to" its asking price of $58 million, making it one of the most expensive New York condo sales of 2019. In August 2019, the developers hired Newmark Group to find tenants for the building's  of retail space on the building's first four floors and basement. One month later, JDS asked lenders for a $1.1 billion loan to replace AIG's $725 million in construction debt.

In 2020, Steinway Hall's landmarked rotunda was restored by John Canning Studios, which mitigated water damage, repaired the ceiling and entablatures, and cleaned the walls and metalwork. The facade and roof of the hall were also restored. That April, the first sale for a unit in Steinway Hall was finalized. However, construction slowed considerably in early 2020 due to the COVID-19 pandemic in New York City. This caused the project to fall into danger of missing key construction deadlines and a corresponding decline in sales, and thus face the possibility of having to repay outstanding debt. Despite a general decrease in real estate activity due to the pandemic, there were several multi-million-dollar sales at 111 West 57th Street during mid-2020, and a penthouse went into contract for $50 million that December.

The facade of the tower was being completed by September 2020. The exterior hoist was being disassembled from the facade by March 2021, as the tower approached completion. In May 2021, Todd Morley said he would construct the world's largest non-fungible token museum at 111 West 57th Street. According to Morley, his blockchain company Overline would use the top of the building as an antenna. Corcoran Group replaced Douglas Elliman as the building's brokerage in February 2022, and the podium was being completed by that March. By the next month, workers had installed the final elements of the facade, and the first condominium sales were being finalized. By May 2022, nearly half of the condominiums had been sold.

Legal controversies

AmBase lawsuits 
AmBase filed a lawsuit in April 2016, alleging that the developers neglected to account for cost overruns reaching $50 million. AmBase sought damages of $105 million in relation to the two capital calls in which they did not participate, claiming that these capital calls served mainly to dilute their stake. AmBase also claimed that Becker and Ruhan did not have their 26 percent stake diluted despite not participating in the capital calls. Since construction costs had allegedly risen by more than 10 percent, AmBase claimed their contract entitled them to full repayment of their $66 million investment along with 20 percent interest. JDS and PMG countersued in January 2017, alleging that since there had never been an officially approved budget, there was no measure by which to determine cost overruns.

AmBase filed another lawsuit in mid-2017, claiming that Maloney and Stern were colluding with the lender to allow a foreclosure which would wipe out AmBase's $66 million equity investment while preserving Maloney and Stern's $35 million stake. The New York Supreme Court's trial division ruled in August 2017 that Maloney and Stern would receive full control of the project. AmBase lost its appeal to the Appellate Division in January 2018.

AmBase refiled the second lawsuit in federal court in early 2018, claiming that Maloney and Stern's alleged collusion with Spruce violated the Racketeer Influenced and Corrupt Organizations Act and seeking a $136 million judgment. At the time, AmBase and founder Richard Bianco faced their own lawsuit from hedge fund IsZo Capital, which claimed the company had purposefully forced the 2017 foreclosure by denying the Baupost Group loan, for Bianco's own benefit. In October 2018, AmBase's federal lawsuit was dismissed after the court found no evidence of collusion between Maloney, Stern, and Spruce. After the dismissal of their three previous lawsuits, AmBase again sued Spruce Capital, Maloney, and Stern in May 2019, restating previous allegations of collusion and seeking additional damages for the developers' alleged breach of their fiduciary duties.  AmBase then appealed to the United States Court of Appeals for the Second Circuit, which declined the appeal in September 2019.

Other lawsuits 

In June 2018, Barbara Corcoran sued the building's developers for $30 million, claiming that her brokerage company's contract to market the building's units had been unfairly terminated. The developers claimed that the brokerage had been replaced with Douglas Elliman after failing to sell 25 percent of the building's units by the middle of 2018 as required by their contract. However, Corcoran claimed that due to the numerous lawsuits, delays, and cost overruns, the developers had halted marketing and sales for the units which made it impossible for the brokerage to reach their sales hurdles. Corcoran also sued Douglas Elliman for tortious interference, claiming the company had hired away the building's sales director in violation of her non-compete clause.

In December 2020, JDS sued HVAC contractor Copper II and the contractor's insurer Talisman Casualty for over $11.7 million. In its lawsuit, the developers claimed that Copper II had delayed its installation of the HVAC system, leading them to warn the contractor in November 2018. JDS also claimed that, due to improper installation of the HVAC system, ten stories sustained water damage during July 2019. In August 2021, JDS sued crane contractor US Crane & Rigging and one of its subsidiaries for $50 million, claiming that the contractor's negligence had caused glass panels on the facade to break the previous October (see ).

Labor controversies 
The developers intended for the tower to become New York City's tallest building constructed with non-union labor. Non-unionized workers could be paid at cheaper rates and did not have to be paid double overtime, hourly pension fees, and benefit fees. The decision was condemned by the Building and Construction Trades Council of Greater New York's leader, Gary LaBarbera, who in May 2015 criticized the developers for not using union labor or giving the workers adequate safety training. The union detailed multiple incidents that had occurred at the site including "a worker falling from scaffold that lacked a railing, one worker who fell in a partial building collapse and another who had his leg crushed when a steel beam slipped." Manhattan Borough President Gale Brewer sided with LaBarbera, sending Stern a letter expressing concern over the workers' safety, training, and pay. New York City Public Advocate Letitia James echoed Brewer's concerns and agreed that the usage of non-union labor could lead to increased danger for workers.

Cyrus Vance Jr., then the New York County District Attorney, indicted subcontractor Parkside Construction in May 2018 for several financial crimes. The indictment included charges of stealing $1.7 million from 520 workers on the project by purposely shorting their hours and failing to pay them overtime, hiding nearly $42 million in wages from state insurance officials to avoid paying workers' compensation premiums, and using undocumented immigrants from Mexico and Ecuador. The company's owners, Francesco and Salvatore Pugliese, were arrested and charged with grand larceny, insurance fraud and scheme to defraud. The company's construction foreman, its payroll manager, and an outside accountant were also charged in the scheme. Parkside had previously been sued in 2015 in a class-action lawsuit by former workers on the site, who had alleged widespread wage theft. In February 2021, the Pugliese brothers pleaded guilty to insurance fraud and were forced to pay the insurance fund $1.4 million in exchange for a conditional discharge. The brothers did not receive a prison sentence, nor were they forced to give restitution to their employees.

Safety incidents 
On January 21, 2019, a suspended scaffold attached to the building broke free from the exterior of floor 55 and showered pieces of broken glass from cracked windows over nearby sidewalks due to high winds. The New York City Buildings Department initiated a partial stop work order, and issued the site a violation for failure to safeguard construction equipment. A year later, in January 2020, a terracotta block fell from the tower, denting the roof of a passing taxi. Another high wind on October 29, 2020, knocked the tower's construction crane loose, causing debris to fall. While the crane was quickly secured and no one was injured, the surrounding neighborhood was closed off for several hours. Two weeks later, on November 15, a glass curtain wall fell 56 floors into a nearby street. On December 24, 2020, an  pane of glass fell from the 58th Street side of the building, although nobody was hurt.

In February 2022, a slab of ice was suspected to have fallen from 111 West 57th Street, damaging a car on the ground and injuring its driver. The Department of Buildings fined the building's owners after that incident.

Critical reception
Writing for Vanity Fair, architectural critic Paul Goldberger referred to the plans for the tower as "quite possibly the most elegant" of Billionaires' Row's structures. Goldberger described it as "a subtle and graceful re-interpretation in modern form of the stepped-back, "wedding cake" towers of New York's past". C. J. Hughes of The New York Times said that the tower rejected "the crystalline look so popular with new developments in the neighborhood". Architectural critic Carter Horsley wrote that the tower was "a very original design by SHoP" and that it "definitely has a feminine character" with its crown resembling a tiara. Skyscraper Museum founder Carol Willis was optimistic that several Billionaires' Row buildings would become New York City designated landmarks in the 2050s, saying: "I have no doubt that some—such as 432 Park Avenue and 111 W 57 Street—will be designated as superior examples of the iconic forms characteristic of New York of the 2010s." Bianca Bosker of The Atlantic called 111 West 57th Street "a luxury condominium resembling the love child of a dustbuster and a Mach3 razor".

Some critics also wrote about the building's slenderness ratio. Justin Davidson of New York magazine wrote: "No tower will be the last, biggest, or tallest for long, but this one might be the best." A writer for The Wall Street Journal in 2021 said: "These are not the proportions of a classical column but of a coffee stirrer."

The construction of 111 West 57th Street also garnered some criticism. In 2015, when the tower was still in development, a neighborhood group protested the fact that the Steinway Tower and other Billionaires' Row towers would cast long shadows over Central Park. When the building was nearly complete, in 2019, a writer for Business Insider visited one of the condominium units, saying: "I can't say that my tour of its first condo felt too different from another Billionaires' Row apartment I've visited." Edwin Heathcote of the Financial Times described the new residential skyscraper as a "skinnyscraper" that was the "purest illustration of architecture as an expression of surplus capital". Heathcote lamented that its purpose—rather than being a bustling city unto itself that would unite people, as was the goal for skyscrapers built in the 1920s and 1930s—was the "exclusion of 99.99 per cent".

See also 

 List of New York City Designated Landmarks in Manhattan from 14th to 59th Streets
 List of tallest buildings
 in New York City
 in the United States
 in the world
 with a residential purpose

References

Notes

Citations

Sources

External links

 

2021 establishments in New York City
Condominiums and housing cooperatives in Manhattan
Midtown Manhattan
Pencil towers in New York City
Residential buildings completed in 2021
Residential condominiums in New York City
Residential skyscrapers in Manhattan
Skyscrapers on 57th Street (Manhattan)